KTO may refer to:

KTO (TV channel), a French-language religious international television channel
KTO Rosomak, a Polish military vehicle
Korea Tourism Organization, South Korean government-owned tourism agency
Kato Airport (IATA: KTO), in Guyana
Kuot language (ISO 639-3: kto), spoken in Papua New Guinea

See also